The Meydan mosque is a historical mosque in Kashan, Iran. It is located in the southern side of the Sang-e Ghadimi square and beside the Bazaar of Kashan. It is one of the oldest structures in Kashan. The primary structure belonged possibly to the seljuq era, but it was destroyed by the Mongols during their invasions. Later it was rebuilt and repaired by Khaje Emad ed-Din. A quotation for this matter is an inscription in the old mihrab, in which it is mentioned that it is built in 623 Hijri (1226 AD) by Hassan ebn-e Arabschah in Kashan. The mihrab was in its original place until the last century, but it is kept now in the Museum of Islamic art in Berlin.

Jane Dieulafoy describes the mihrab as follows:
"Meydan mosque is a spacious structure with an appropriate architectural technique, but its distinctive characteristic in comparison with other similar structures is its exquisite mihrab, which is covered with splendid tiles with metal reflections. With respect to their high-quality these tiles are like the famous tiles of Imamzadeh Yahya in Varamin."

Abd ol-Ghaffar Najm od-Dole predicted well in 1882 the future of the mihrab as follows:
"The embossed tiles, which I saw in the mihrab of Meydan mosque, were very interesting and spectacular. Westerners will buy them at least 2000 Tomans and will take the poor tiles away, if they can get a chance."

The mosque had in its past glorious times high iwans, a splendid inner dome space, large yard, Shabestan and Howz hall, but despite many repairs most parts of the mosque have been destroyed. The mosque had a special social and political importance, which can be realized from many orders written above its portal. These orders date back to the 15th century in the Kara Koyunlu era until the 19th century in the Qajar era. These orders include guidelines, regulations and commands about the buying and selling of goods and food stuffs with approved prices of that time and about the prohibition of gamble and acts against the sharia.

The portal of the mosque stands out because of its pure Iranian architectural techniques.

The former stone minaret was destroyed in 1778 in the late Safavid era by an earthquake.

See also 
List of the historical structures in the Isfahan province

References 

Mosques in Isfahan Province
Buildings and structures in Kashan
Mosque buildings with domes